Benjamin Knapper is an English football manager who is the loan manager of Arsenal.

Career

In 2008, Knapper graduated from the University of Hull with a degree in Sports Coaching and Performance. In 2007, he was appointed analyst of English second tier side Scunthorpe. 

In 2019, he was appointed loan manager of Arsenal in the English Premier League.

References

Arsenal F.C. non-playing staff 
Living people
Scunthorpe United F.C. non-playing staff
Alumni of the University of Hull